The Aliens Act 1826 was an Act of Parliament that required immigrants to inform the Secretary of State or the Chief Secretary of Ireland of their place of residence twice a year.

External links 
The text is available for consultation at The National Archives:
 the text of the act part1
 the text of the act part2

United Kingdom Acts of Parliament 1826